Ben Twell (30 August 1903 – 1986) was an English professional footballer who played as a forward. Most notably he was a forward for Southport, scoring a hat trick in three consecutive games. He scored 25 goals in 22 appearances there, before being transferred to New Brighton.

References

1903 births
1986 deaths
People from North East Derbyshire District
Footballers from Derbyshire
English footballers
Association football forwards
Staveley Town F.C. players
Matlock Town F.C. players
Hardwick Colliery F.C. players
Grassmoor Ivanhoe F.C. players
Grimsby Town F.C. players
Southport F.C. players
New Brighton A.F.C. players
Fleetwood Town F.C. players
Ashfield United F.C. players
Temple Normanton Old Boys F.C. players
Clay Cross Rangers F.C. players
Temple Normanton Red Rose F.C. players
English Football League players